Schistocarpaea is a monotypic genus of flowering plants belonging to the family Rhamnaceae. The only species is Schistocarpaea johnsonii.

Its native range is Queensland.

References

Rhamnaceae
Rhamnaceae genera
Monotypic Rosales genera